The House of Ulfeldt is the name of an old and distinguished Danish-German noble family. The family was represented by several royal Danish councilors during the 15th and 16th century, when the family was among the most influential in Denmark.

History 
The family was first mentioned in a written document from 1186, with the name Strange, but in the 16th century they began to call themselves Ulfeldt after the family coat of arms. Family members held the title of Count in Denmark and Imperial Count within the Holy Roman Empire, but went extinct in male line in 1769.

Notable members
Anton Corfiz Ulfeldt (1699–1769), Austrian politician and diplomat of Danish descent
Corfits Ulfeldt (naval officer) (1600–1644), Danish naval officer
Corfitz Ulfeldt (1606–1664), Danish statesman, and one of the most notorious traitors in Danish history
Ebbe Ulfeldt (1600–1670), brother of the Danish naval officer Corfits Ulfeldt, became a landscape painter in Delft
Hedevig Ulfeldt (1626–1678), the daughter of king Christian IV of Denmark and Kirsten Munk
Jacob Ulfeldt (1535–1593), Danish diplomat and member of the Privy Council from 1565
Jacob Ulfeldt (born 1567) (1567–1630), Danish diplomat and explorer and chancellor of King Christian IV of Denmark
Leonora Christina Ulfeldt (1621–1698), the daughter of King Christian IV of Denmark and wife of Count Corfitz Ulfeldt
Mogens Ulfeldt (1569–1616), Danish naval officer and landowner

References